Max Porter (born 1981 in New York) is an American animator and filmmaker, best known for his stop-motion film, Negative Space for which he received critical acclaim and was co-nominated for an Academy Award nomination for Academy Award for Best Animated Short Film with co-director and wife Ru Kuwahata. He is a faculty member at the Rhode Island School of Design.

Filmography
 2017: Negative Space (Short) 
 2016: Perfect Houseguest (Short)  
 2014: Between Times (Short)  
 2010: Something Left, Something Taken (Short)

Awards and nominations
 Nominated: Academy Award for Best Animated Short Film

References

External links
  
 Max Porter at RISD 
 Max Porter at Lynda.com

1981 births
Living people
Stop motion animators
American animated film directors
American animated film producers
American producers
American directors
American animators
Rhode Island School of Design faculty
Rhode Island School of Design alumni